Wurzelbacher is a surname. Notable people with the surname include:

Samuel Joseph Wurzelbacher (born 1973), also known as "Joe the Plumber", American conservative activist and commentator
Robert Wurzelbacher (born 1954), American businessman